Ownesville may refer to:

Owensville, California
Owensville, Indiana
Owensville, Maryland
Owensville, Missouri
Owensville, Ohio
Owensville, Texas